Manji Fukushima is a male former table tennis player from Japan. In 1963 he won three gold medals in singles, doubles, and team events in the Asian Table Tennis Championships.

References

Japanese male table tennis players
Living people
Year of birth missing (living people)
Place of birth missing (living people)